Kampong Perpindahan Mata-Mata is a public housing estate and designated village in Brunei-Muara District, Brunei, on the outskirts of the capital Bandar Seri Begawan. The population was 2,385 in 2016. It is one of the villages within Mukim Gadong 'B'. The postcode is BE1918.

See also 
 Public housing in Brunei
 STKRJ Kampong Mata-Mata

References 

Villages in Brunei-Muara District
Public housing estates in Brunei